The Midland Union of Natural History Societies (initially the Union of Midland Natural History Societies) was an association of amateur groups in the English Midlands and central Wales, which existed from 1877. For sixteen years it published a journal, The Midland Naturalist, and from 1881 awarded a medal, the Darwin Prize. The phrase "Natural History" was interpreted broadly, and the groups' interests included archaeology, architecture and geology.

History 

The success of a Tamworth Natural History, Geological, and Antiquarian Society meeting held early in 1874, joined by the Birmingham Natural History and Microscopical Society (BNHMS) led , Honorary Secretary of the latter, to propose closer collaboration between local natural history societies. Eventually, on 17 August 1876 committee meeting of the Birmingham society, decided to investigate the formation of  a union of such groups. Representatives of various societies met at the Midland Institute, Birmingham, on 28 August 1877, and elected a council to manage the union.

The eminent surgeon and president of the BNHMS, Lawson Tait, played a leading role in the formation and early administration of the Union. He resigned his positions on the managing bodies of both organisations in 1878, in a dispute over the Union's subscription fees.

In 1885, the Union wrote a letter to The Times (published 6 July) pointing out "that many of our rarest and most beautiful native plants have already been, or are being, rapidly exterminated" due to over-enthusiastic collection by both botanists and professional dealers, and calling for measures to reduce this loss. The calls were supported in an editorial in the same issue.

The last press reports on the Union's activities appeared in the Birmingham Daily Post in August 1894, when:

Presidents 

 
 Circa 1881: Thomas Wright

Midland Naturalist 

A journal, The Midland Naturalist, subtitled "The Journal of The Associated Natural History, Philosophical, and Archæologigal Societies and Field Clubs of the Midland Counties", was published from 1878 to 1893. Volumes 1-9 were edited by Edward W. Badger and William Jerome Harrison; Volumes 10-16 by Badger and W. Hillhouse.

From 1883 (volume 6) the journal incorporated the Annual Proceedings of the Birmingham Natural History and Microscopical Society, which had previously been published separately. From volume 7 it took on the same role for the Leicester Literary and Philosophical Society.

At least one species description was published in the journal, that for Russula claroflava, whose type specimen was found in Sutton Park by William Bywater Grove in 1888.

The Birmingham Daily Post article of August 1894 referred to the journal as "now defunct", without further explanation.

Darwin Prize 

The society established an annual award in 1880, for original research by individual members of the member societies, submitted for publication in The Midland Naturalist, in the fields of geology, archaeology, zoology, or botany. Recipients had a choice of a gold medal, or a bronze medal and cash, with a total value of £10 initially. Permission to name the award after Charles Darwin, and to include his likeness on the medal, was granted by Darwin himself, who wrote:

The medal was engraved by Joseph Moore, of Birmingham. Its obverse showed a bust of Darwin, facing slightly right, below which was signed "". The reverse featured the wording "The Darwin Medal / Awarded to / Founded by the Midland Union of Natural History Societies 1880,", with space on a cartouche for the recipient's name, year and subject area, and below that a depiction of a branch of coral. The edge was plain.

The award was first given in 1881 and was restricted to the topic of geology, the next year to biology, and the third year to archaeology, then the pattern repeated, before being abandoned. Recipients included:

 
 
 
 
 
 
 
 

The Birmingham Daily Post article of August 1894 noted an agreement that, with the demise of The Midland Naturalist, the prize "should in future be awarded to the author of the best paper on a given subject in a newspaper or journal within the area of the union".

The wax model for the medal is now at Darwin's former home, Down House, along with the unused 1886 medal, which was sent to Darwin's family at that time.

Members 

In its first year, membership of the Union included:

 Birmingham Natural History and Microscopical Society
 Birmingham Philosophical Society (merged with the above in 1894)
 Birmingham School Natural History Society
 Burton-on-Trent Natural History and Archælogical Society
 Ceradoc Field Club
 Derbyshire Naturalists' Society
 Dudley and Midland Geological and Philosophical Society and Field Club
 Leicester Literary and Philosophical Society
 Northampton Naturalists' Society
 Nottingham Literary and Philosophical Society (dissolved in the year 1882-1883)
 Nottingham Naturalists' Society (withdrew in the year 1885/1886)
 Rugby School Natural History Society
 Oswestry and Welshpool Naturalists' Field Club
 Severn Valley Naturalists' Field Club
 Shropshire Archæological and Natural History Society
 Stroud Natural History and Philosophical Society
 Tamworth Natural History, Geological and Antiquarian Society

Additional members, with date of joining, included:

 Peterborough Natural History and Scientific Society (year ending May 1879)
 Nottingham High School Natural History Society (year ending May 1879)
 Small Heath Literary and Scientific Society (year ending May 1879)
 Bedfordshire Natural History and Field Club (1880; withdrew in the year 1885/1886)

References 

1877 establishments in England
Natural history societies
Organizations established in 1877
Organizations established in the 1890s
1890s disestablishments in England